Frank Chapple, Baron Chapple (8 August 1921 – 19 October 2004) was general secretary of the Electrical, Electronic, Telecommunications and Plumbing Union (EETPU), a leading British trade union.

Frank Chapple was born in the slum area of Hoxton, east London, in a flat above his father's shoe-repair shop. As was normal in most homes throughout the country at the time, there was no bath or running hot water in the Chapple home. A Communist Party member early in his adult life, Chapple left the party after, and partly as a result of, the Soviet suppression of the Hungarian Revolution of 1956. Thereafter, he remained a forceful anti-communist.

He served as a member of the Trades Union Congress general council for 12 years to 1983, having first joined the union in 1937, and he had held offices at every level in the electricians' union. From 1966 to 1984 he was the general secretary of the EETPU. After his retirement, he was elevated to the House of Lords as a life peer on 4 February 1985 taking the title Baron Chapple, of Hoxton in Greater London. His successor was fellow anti-communist Eric Hammond. One of Chapple's sons, Barry Chapple, was a regional official of Amicus, which succeeded the EETPU. Amicus merged with the TGWU in 2007 to become Unite the Union.

References

Further reading
 Aikman, Calum, 'Frank Chapple: A Thoughtful Trade Union Moderniser', in Alternatives to State-Socialism in Britain: Other Worlds of Labour in the Twentieth Century, eds. Peter Ackers and Alastair J. Reid (Basingstoke: Palgrave Macmillan, 2016), pp. 211-42.
 Chapple, Frank, Sparks Fly: A Trade Union Life (London: Michael Joseph, 1984).
 Goodman, Geoffrey, 'Chapple, Francis [Frank], Baron Chapple', Oxford Dictionary of National Biography, 2001–4 volume, pp. 196–8.
 Lloyd, John, Light and Liberty: The History of the EETPU (London: Weidenfeld and Nicolson, 1990)

External links
BBC obituary
Catalogue of Chapple's papers, held at the Modern Records Centre, University of Warwick

1921 births
2004 deaths
Crossbench life peers
General Secretaries of the Electrical Trades Union (United Kingdom)
People from Hoxton
People from Shoreditch
Members of the General Council of the Trades Union Congress
Presidents of the Trades Union Congress
Communist Party of Great Britain members
British Army personnel of World War II
Royal Electrical and Mechanical Engineers soldiers
English electricians
Electrical, Electronic, Telecommunications and Plumbing Union
Life peers created by Elizabeth II